The Pakistan national cricket team toured Australia in the 1995–96 season and played 3 Test matches against Australia.  Australia won the series 2-1.

Test series summary

1st Test
{{Two-innings cricket match
| date = 9–13 November 1995(5-day match)
| team1 = 
| team2 = 

| score-team1-inns1 = 463 (161.5 overs)
| runs-team1-inns1 = SR Waugh 112* (275)
| wickets-team1-inns1 = Waqar Younis 3/101 (29.5 overs)

| score-team2-inns1 = 97 (41.1 overs)
| runs-team2-inns1 = Aamer Sohail 32 (66)
| wickets-team2-inns1 = SK Warne 7/23 (16.1 overs)

| score-team1-inns2 = 
| runs-team1-inns2 = 
| wickets-team1-inns2 =

| score-team2-inns2 = 240 (f/o) (85.5 overs)
| runs-team2-inns2 = Aamer Sohail 99 (159)
| wickets-team2-inns2 = SK Warne 4/54 (27.5 overs)

| result = Australia won by an innings and 126 runs
| report = Scorecard
| venue = Brisbane Cricket Ground, Woolloongabba, Brisbane
| umpires = KE Liebenberg (SA) and SG Randell (AUS)
| motm = SK Warne (AUS)
| toss = Australia won the toss and elected to bat.
| rain = 12 November was taken as a rest day.The match was scheduled for five days but completed in four.| notes = Saleem Elahi (PAK) made his Test debut.
}}

2nd Test

3rd Test

External sources
 CricketArchive
 Cricinfo

References
 Playfair Cricket Annual Wisden Cricketers Almanack ''

1995 in Australian cricket
1995 in Pakistani cricket
1995–96 Australian cricket season
International cricket competitions from 1994–95 to 1997
1995-96